Wells City F.C. are a football club based in Wells, Somerset, England. The club is affiliated to the Somerset County FA.

History
They joined the Western League Division Two in 1929 and won the Western League title in 1950. Declining performances culminated in relegation to the second division after the 1956–57 season and after three seasons in the Western League Division Two, Wells City left the league.

Wells rejoined the Somerset Senior League in 1960–61 with the reserves competing in the Mid-Somerset Football League. Wells finished 6th in their first season back in the Somerset Senior League. The side finished very much in mid-table until 1965–66 when they were third behind Street and Welton Rovers Reserves. They were runners-up behind Paulton Rovers in 1971–72. Relegation from the Premier Division to Division occurred at the end of the 1977–78 season with promotion to the top section being gained at the end of 1979–80. 1981–82 saw another relegation. Promotion back again was a long time in arriving, not until 1994 would Wells City grace the top flight of Somerset football. Soon the yo-yo effect happened once more with relegation at the end of 1997–98 followed by bouncing straight back up in 1998–99. The club maintained a Premier Division place until promotion back to the Western Football League Division One in 2008.

Wells City would finally reclaim the Somerset Senior Cup in 2006–07, defeating Burnham United 2–1 at Weston-super-Mare.

Wells City's first season back in the Western League saw them finish a respectable mid-table finish in 10th place.

On 24 April 2010 Wells City earned promotion to the Premier Division of the Western Football League after finishing 1st. They were however relegated back to Division One in 2013.

Ground

Wells City play their home games at the Athletic Ground, Rowdens Road, Wells, BA5 1TU.

Honours

League honours
 Western League Division One:
Winners: 1949–50, 2009–10
Runners-up: 1950–51, 2015–16
 Somerset County Football League Premier Division:
Runners-up: 2007–08

Cup honours
Somerset Premier Cup
Winners: 2015–16 
 Somerset Senior Cup:
Winners: 1896–97, 1930–31, 1931–32 (Joint with Radstock Town F.C.), 1937–38, 2006–07 
Runners-up: 1895–96, 1927–28, 1929–30, 1938–39, 1947–48, 2001–02
Somerset Junior Cup
Winners (1): 1901–02

Records

 FA Cup: 4th Qualifying Round in 1954–55 season
 FA Vase: 2nd Round in 2009–10 season

References

External links
Official club website

Football clubs in Somerset
Wells, Somerset
Football clubs in England
Association football clubs established in 1890
1890 establishments in England
Western Football League